Gilbert de Goldschmidt (26 April 1925 - 1 January 2010) was a German-born French film producer and writer.

Life and career 
Born in Berlin, at young age de Goldschmidt moved to France, where he started his first production company Madeleine Films in 1951. Among his about 40 produced films were Jacques Demy's Palme d'Or winner and Academy Award nominated The Umbrellas of Cherbourg,  Raoul Coutard's Academy Award nominated Hoa-Binh, and a number of  Yves Robert's successful comedies, notably The Tall Blond Man with One Black Shoe. He also produced TV-commercials, and distribuited foreign films in France, including some Monty Python films.

During his career, de Goldschmidt received various honours, including the  Legion of Honour, the Ordre des Arts et des Lettres and the Ordre national du Mérite. He served as juror at the 1983 Cannes Film Festival and at the 1988 Venice International Film Festival. He was cousin of the actress Clio Goldsmith.

References

External links

 

1925 births
2010 deaths
People from Berlin
French film producers
Recipients of the Legion of Honour
Recipients of the Ordre des Arts et des Lettres
Recipients of the Ordre national du Mérite